Harpalus numidicus is a species of ground beetle in the subfamily Harpalinae. It was described by Bedel in 1893 and is found in Spain, Morocco, and Algeria.

References

numidicus
Beetles described in 1893